Ability was a wooden ketch of 48 tons, owned by J. Breckenridge and built at William Woodward in 1878. She ran aground at Cape Hawke, New South Wales, Australia, in 1897.

Shipwreck
On 5 January 1897, traveling from Cape Hawke to Sydney with a load of timber, Ability broke her moorings and was beached at Cape Hawke, near Forster, New South Wales. There were no reported deaths.

References

Sources

Australian shipwrecks Vol. 3 1871–1900 By Loney, J. K. (Jack Kenneth), 1925–1995. Geelong Vic: List Publishing, 1982 910.4530994 LON

Shipwrecks of the Mid North Coast Region
Ships built in New South Wales
1878 ships
Maritime incidents in 1897
1871–1900 ships of Australia
Ketches of Australia